Toowoomba–Cecil Plains Road is a continuous  road route in the Toowoomba region of Queensland, Australia. Most of the road is not signed with any route number, but a short section near  is part of State Route 82. Toowoomba–Cecil Plains Road (number 324) is a state-controlled district road, part of which is rated as a local road of regional significance (LRRS).

Route Description
The Toowoomba–Cecil Plains Road commences as Taylor Street at an intersection with the Toowoomba Connection Road in Newtown, a suburb of Toowoomba. It runs west, becoming Carrington Road and turning north-west as it enters . It turns south and then west as it enters  as Toowoomba–Cecil Plains Road. It passes under the Gore Highway (Toowoomba Bypass), runs past the Toowoomba Wellcamp Airport, and enters . From here the road passes through open crop-farming land for the rest of its length.

After entering  the road turns south at an intersection with Bowenville–Norwin Road. It continues for a short distance before again turning west at an intersection with Brookstead–Norwin Road. It then passes through  and enters Cecil Plains. Here it passes Pampas–Horrane Road (State Route 82) where it becomes part of State Route 82 before ending at an intersection with Dalby–Cecil Plains Road (State Route 82).

State Route 82
It is not necessarily the best or the shortest or the quickest route between the two terminii. It was proclaimed as a State Route because, at the time, it was the most convenient route for many users. It is also an example of why motorists in unfamiliar territory should follow a designated route rather than rely on a vehicle navigation system, which may direct them onto less suitable alternative roads.

In Jandowae the road name changes to Dalby–Jandowae Road, which continues to the Warrego Highway in the west of Dalby. From there it follows the Warrego Highway to the south-east until it reaches Dalby–Cecil Plains Road, where it continues south.

At a T-junction in Cecil Plains, State Route 82 turns east on Toowoomba–Cecil Plains Road until it reaches Pampas–Horrane Road, where it turns south. Note that many navigation systems will suggest a turn to the west in Cecil Plains, leading to Millmerran–Cecil Plains Road. State Route 82 follows Pampas–Horrane Road to Pampas, where it meets the Gore Highway at a T-junction. This road continues south to Inglewood, where it meets the Cunningham Highway at a T-junction.

Road condition
Toowoomba–Cecil Plains Road is fully sealed.

History

The first roads on the Darling Downs were cut to provide access for wheeled vehicles to the pastoral runs and new settlements. Some of these radiated from Toowoomba like the spokes of a wheel. Between the north-west road (now Warrego Highway) and the south-west road (now Gore Highway) was the western road (now Toowoomba–Cecil Plains Road).

Cecil Plains pastoral run was established in 1842. In 1877  was resumed from the Cecil Plains pastoral run to establish smaller farms. This resumption soon led to closer settlement and a demand for better roads to enable the commercial success of the new farms.

A postal receiving office opened in 1890, and the first school in 1898. Over time the areas along the line of road from Cecil Plains to Toowoomba were settled as farms of various sizes. In 1916, Cecil Plains station was acquired by the Queensland Government and subdivided for closer settlement, with some parcels reserved for soldier settlers. The new settlers produced mainly wheat and dairy.

Upgrades

Taylor Street cycleway
A project to develop a business case for a cycleway on Taylor Street, at a cost of $430,000, was to complete in June 2022.

Safety upgrades
A project to plan safety upgrades, at a cost of $250,000, was completed in December 2021.

Major intersections
All distances are from Google Maps. The entire road is in the Toowoomba local government area.

See also

 List of road routes in Queensland
 List of numbered roads in Queensland

Notes

References

Roads in Queensland
Toowoomba Region